Hừa Ngài is a commune (xã) and village of the Mường Chà District of Điện Biên Province, northwestern Vietnam.

Communes of Điện Biên province
Populated places in Điện Biên province